Kunal Singh Yadav is an Indian actor associated with Bhojpuri cinema. Also referred to as Amitabh Bachchan  of Bhojpuri Cinema because of his dominance on Bhojpuri cinema and also as Jitendra of Bhojpuri cinema because of his remarkable resemblance with the bollywood actor Jitendra, Kunal, in his four-decade long career, has acted in more than 250 movies. For his contributions to cinema, he was awarded the Rashtrakavi Dinkar Award in 2012 by Pranab Mukherjee.

Life 
Kunal was born in a 1955 in a Yadav family. His father Buddhadev Singh was a senior Congress leader. He has remarkable resemblance with the bollywood actor Jeetendra. In his childhood he was asked to read out from the script of a play named Jantantra Zindabad, for his bad performance in the auditon the director complemented that "acting is not his cup of tea". After this incident he decided to become an actor. He is married to Bengali actress Arati Bhattacharya.

Acting Career 

He made his acting debut with the Hindi film Kal Hamara Hai (1980) directed by Girish Ranjan. He played the role of a Tonga Drive in that film. It did a good business in the theatres of Uttar Pradesh and Bihar. After this film he started getting many offers for Bhojpuri films. His first major success in Bhojpuri was Dharti Maiyaa (1981), in which he played the role of a wayward youth. His biggest hit Ganga Kinare Mora Gaon was released 1983. In a theatre of Varanasi it ran for 16 months. His Ram Jaisan Bhaiyaa Hamar ran for 50 days in Kishanganj and broke the record held by Ram Teri Ganga Maili In 2007, he acted with Amitabh Bachchan and Mithun Chakraborty in the Bhojpuri film Gangotri. His first film in 2022 was Aashiqui starring Khesari Lal Yadav and Amrapali Dubey.

Filmography

Bhojpuri

Hindi

Political Career 

He contested election in 2014 from Patna Sahib as a Congress Candidate against Bharatiya Janata Party candidate Shatrughan Sinha and lost the battle.

Awards
 thumb|  Awarded the RAMDHARI SINGH DINKAR AWARD by honorable President of India, Shri Pranab Mukherjee in 2012 at Rashtrapati Bhawan, New Delhi.
For his contributions to cinema, he was awarded the Rashtrakavi Dinkar Award in 2012 by Pranab Mukherjee

References

Indian male actors
1955 births
Male actors in Bhojpuri cinema
Living people
Indian National Congress politicians from Bihar
Indian actor-politicians